Caracol Radio (Cadena Radial Colombiana, "Colombian Radio Network") is one of the main radio networks in Colombia. Founded in Medellín in 1948 when La Voz de Antioquia station acquired the 50% of Emisoras Nuevo Mundo, based in Bogotá.

Julio Mario Santo Domingo was its main shareholder until 2003, when Spanish Grupo Prisa bought the Grupo Latino de Radio, whose 17% was Santo Domingo's.

History 
In 1945 Colombian Liberal Party politicians César García, Jorge Soto del Corral, Luis Uribe Piedrahita, Alberto Arango Tavera, Carlos Sanz Santamaría, José Gómez Pinzón, Alfonso López Pumarejo, and Alfonso López Michelsen created Sociedad Radiodifusión Interamericana, which would create the Emisora Nuevo Mundo in Bogotá. On 3 September 1948, La Voz de Antioquia acquired the 50% of Emisora Nuevo Mundo. Caracol would be legally founded in 1949. Coltejer, a textile company which had invested in La Voz de Antioquia and Emisoras Nuevo Mundo, would own some shares until 1959.

In the 1950s, the network expanded when Emisoras Fuentes (Cartagena de Indias), Emisoras Unidas (Barranquilla) and RCO Radiodifusora de Occidente (Cali) became affiliates. In 1952 Caracol would create a second station, Radio Reloj, which would become the first station with an all-music format, with a time mention between songs. In 1956, Caracol owned and operated four stations: La Voz de Antioquia (Compañía Colombiana de Radiodifusión, Medellín, HJDM, currently Radio Reloj Medellín), La Voz del Río Cauca (Cali, currently Caracol Cali, HJED), Emisoras Nuevo Mundo and Radio Reloj. The first three created in 1956 the so-called Triángulo de Oro ("Gold triangle"), with 50 kW each, in order to broadcast the Vuelta a Colombia. La Voz del Río Cauca could be heard as far as Argentina. In 1960, Fernando Londoño Henao, a prominent member of the Colombian Conservative Party, became its president.

Between 1958 and 1963, Caracol would acquire several stations, such as Emisora Mil 20, Emisoras Eldorado and La Voz de Colombia (Bogotá), Radio Reloj (Panama), Sociedad Informativa de Contrapunto, La Voz del Café (Pereira), Pregones del Quindío (Armenia), Radio Comercio (Bucaramanga), and Radio Visión (Medellín), and absorb small networks as Cadena Radial Andina and Sociedad Nacional de Radiodifusión. In 2003 Caracol TV was spun off from Caracol Radio. In 1970 it would acquire exclusive broadcasting rights for the 1970 FIFA World Cup in Mexico.

In 1986 Caracol Radio would rent the stations of the Núcleo Radial Bienvenida. In the same year Julio Mario Santo Domingo would acquire the 50% of both Caracol Radio and Caracol TV, with 25% belonging to Alfonso López Michelsen, and the other 25% for the family of Fernando Londoño Henao. In 1990 it would acquire Radio Sutatenza, a network of educational radio stations founded in 1947 which was having financial problems. Radio Sutatenza was the only network in Colombia with transmitters over 50 kW.

On 12 August 2010 at 05:30 (10:30 UTC), a car bomb exploded outside the headquarters of the network, which did not interrupt its broadcast, despite having its building's tiles and windows shattered. FARC were held responsible for the attack.

Radio formats and networks

Current 
Caracol Cadena Básica: basic network, it broadcasts news and variety programmes.
W Radio: replaced Caracol Estéreo in 2003, broadcasting news and talk, with some programmes devoted to jazz, blues, samba, and American contemporary. In recent years, most of the music programmes have been dropped.
Tropicana Estéreo: since the mid-1990s replaced Bienvenida Estéreo as Caracol's tropical radio formula.
Radioacktiva: replaced balada en español station Nota Estéreo in 1989, adopting a rock-and-pop format. Since 1997 it focuses only in rock music.
Caracol Deportes: sports.
Los 40 Principales: pop music and top 40.
Oxígeno: specialized in reggaeton.
La Vallenata: specialized in Vallenato.
Bésame:  specialized in romantic music.

Defunct 
Radio Reloj: (1951-2008) founded in 1951, it mainly broadcasts bolero music, time checks, some news and sports events. Sold to WV Radio.
Emisora Mil XX (1960–1991):The first youth music station created by Caracol, it changed its programming in 1963 to make way for the Radio 15 station.
Radio 15 (1963-1977): music station for young people. Between 1969 and 1977 this station was replaced by Radio Visión.
Radio Visión (1977-1983): Music and sports station, it was replaced by the station HJJZ in 1983.
Radio Deportes (1983-1996): founded in 1983, its flagship station was La Voz de Colombia.
La Voz de Colombia (1958-1987): broadcast romantic music, in 1987 it began to occupy the FM frequency, and in 1989 it was replaced by Radio Recuerdos with a popular music format.
HJJZ (1983-1985): Music station, it was replaced by Radio Recuerdos in 1985.
Caracol Estéreo (1973–2003): broadcast jazz, blues, samba, and American contemporary. In 1987 the stations outside Bogotá adopted a balada en español format. It was replaced by W Radio.
Bienvenida Estéreo (1984-1992): broadcast tropical music, mainly salsa and merengue. It was replaced by Tropicana Estéreo, after some stations switched to Cadena Básica.
Nota Estéreo (-1989): broadcast balada en español. Replaced by Radioacktiva.
Allegro FM (1998–2003): broadcast classical, modern, jazz and new age music.
Musicar FM Estéreo (1978–2000): classical music, joint venture with Carvajal.
Radio Recuerdos (1985-2013) popular music, such as ranchera, carrilera, etc., aimed to a rural audience.
Colorín Colorradio (1992–2013): a children's radio network.

Frequencies (Caracol Cadena Básica)

 Bogotá 100.9 FM / 810 AM
 Medellín 90.3 FM / 750 AM
 Cali 820 AM / 104.0 FM
 Barranquilla 1100 AM/ 90.1 FM 
 Cartagena 1170 AM
 Montería 1310 AM
 Sincelejo 1580 AM
 San Andrés 1260 AM
 Bucaramanga 880 AM / 99.2 FM
 Cúcuta 1090 AM
 Pereira 950 AM/ 107.1 FM 
 Manizales 1180 AM/ 107.1 FM
 Ibagué 1260 AM
 Armenia 1150 AM/ 107.1 FM 
 Pasto 1280 AM
 Quibdó 91.3 FM
 Neiva 1010 AM /  105.3 FM
 Popayán 1330 AM
 Tunja 1120 AM
 Villavicencio 1140 AM
 Sogamoso 1090 AM
 Yopal 106.3 FM
 Leticia 1260 AM

See also
WSUA - Radio Caracol's sister network in Miami

References

External links 
 Caracol Radio (official site in Spanish)

PRISA
Radio networks
Radio stations in Colombia
Radio stations established in 1948
1948 establishments in Colombia